College of Health Sciences may refer to:
Adventist College of Nursing and Health Sciences (Malaysia)
Baptist College of Health Sciences (Tennessee)
Bouvé College of Health Sciences (Massachusetts)
Cabarrus College of Health Sciences (North Carolina) 
Carolinas College of Health Sciences (North Carolina) 
Choonhae College of Health Sciences (South Korea) 
College of Health Sciences (KNUST), Ghana
College of Health Sciences, Bahrain 
Coleman College for Health Sciences (Texas)
Jefferson College of Health Sciences (Virginia)
King Abdulaziz University College of Health Sciences (Saudi Arabia)
Marquette University College of Health Sciences (Wisconsin) 
Mercy College of Health Sciences (Iowa) 
Pennsylvania College of Health Sciences (Pennsylvania) 
Saint Luke's College of Nursing and Health Sciences (Missouri)